This is a list of films released in the 1970s produced in Armenia SSR or directed by Armenian directors or about Armenia or Armenians, ordered by year of release:

References

External links
 Armenian film at the Internet Movie Database

See also
 List of Soviet films

1970
Lists of 1970s films
Films